José Ramón Corchado Santiago (born 16 November 1957) is a Spanish retired footballer who played as a right winger, and is a manager.

He played 140 La Liga games for Salamanca and Zaragoza, scoring 25 goals, while achieving 87 appearances and 30 goals in Segunda División B for Salamanca and Hércules. A Copa del Rey winner with Zaragoza in 1986, he never managed higher than Segunda División B, but achieved a cup win for Toledo over Real Madrid in 2000.

Playing career
Born in Torrijos in the province of Toledo, Corchado moved from his hometown club CD Torrijos to Atlético Madrid as a teenager. Having been advised by manager Luis Aragonés that his first-team prospects were slim, he moved to fellow La Liga club UD Salamanca on loan in 1979, before joining permanently in exchange for Balbino García.

Salamanca manager Manolo Villanova recommended Corchado to Real Zaragoza manager Leo Beenhakker, and he transferred in 1983. On 10 February 1985 he scored the winning goal in the club's first victory at Real Madrid's Santiago Bernabéu Stadium; he was also in the team that won the Copa del Rey in 1985–86 with a 1–0 win over FC Barcelona in the final.

Corchado wound down his career in Segunda División with Hércules CF and Segunda División B with CD Alcoyano and local club CD Toledo. He was the captain of Hércules and Toledo.

Managerial career
Corchado began coaching in the youth ranks of Toledo, before returning to Torrijos and subsequently leading CD Manchego, CF Motril and Toledo in the third tier. On 13 December 2000, in the last 64 of the Copa del Rey, he guided Toledo to a 2–1 home win over Vicente del Bosque's Real Madrid.

After being dismissed and replaced at Toledo by José Aurelio Gay in February 2001, Corchado managed Cartagonova FC, Zamora CF and others.

References

External links

1957 births
Living people
Sportspeople from the Province of Toledo
Spanish footballers
Footballers from Castilla–La Mancha
Association football wingers
La Liga players
Segunda División players
Segunda División B players
Atlético Madrid B players
UD Salamanca players
Real Zaragoza players
Hércules CF players
CD Alcoyano footballers
CD Toledo players
Spanish football managers
Segunda División B managers
CD Toledo managers
FC Cartagena managers
Zamora CF managers
CF Fuenlabrada managers
Spain youth international footballers
Spain under-21 international footballers